North Newton Junior-Senior High School is a public high school located in Morocco, Indiana.

See also
 List of high schools in Indiana Nathanial B

References
jonata jones

External links
 Official Website

Buildings and structures in Newton County, Indiana
Public middle schools in Indiana
Public high schools in Indiana